Jacob Hosias is a former Israeli footballer who played in Maccabi Netanya from 1950 to 1962.

Honours
Netanya Cup
Winner (1): 1953
State Cup
Runner-up (1): 1953-54

References

Living people
Israeli Jews
Israeli footballers
Maccabi Netanya F.C. players
Liga Leumit players
Association footballers not categorized by position
Year of birth missing (living people)